Martha Brown may refer to:

 Elizabeth Martha Brown (1811–1856), last woman to be publicly hanged in Dorset, England
 Martha Brown (figure skater), American figure skater
 Martha McClellan Brown (1838–1916), American social reformer, major leader in the temperance movement